Ko Kyung-te (born April 6, 1995 in Tokyo) is a South Korean football player. He plays for Tokyo Musashino City FC.

Playing career
Ko Kyung-te joined Nagano Parceiro in 2014. In August 2015, he moved to Grulla Morioka. In 2016, he went back to Nagano Parceiro before moving to Briobecca Urayasu.

Club statistics
Updated to 22 February 2018.

References

External links

1995 births
Living people
Association football people from Tokyo
South Korean footballers
J3 League players
Japan Football League players
AC Nagano Parceiro players
Iwate Grulla Morioka players
Briobecca Urayasu players
Tokyo Musashino United FC players
Association football midfielders